The Sudden Impact! Entertainment Company is an entertainment company based in New York City, United States. The company has created temporary and permanent scare attractions for amusement parks and traveling carnivals across the globe.

History
The Sudden Impact! Entertainment Company was founded in 1991 by Lynton V. Harris. Harris was born in Australia and began his career as a DJ at age 15. From there he worked up the ranks to be marketing director for 10 Australian radio stations. In 1991, he travelled to the United States and discovered the money that could be made in entertainment attractions. Harris started the Sudden Impact! Entertainment Company with an aim of operating attractions at Madison Square Gardens in New York City. In 1996, the company began a four-year season of Madison SCARE Gardens selling approximately 250,000 tickets.

In the early 2000s, the company was ready to open their attractions in Washington, however, due to the September 11 attacks and the Beltway sniper attacks (in 2001 and 2002 respectively), these plans were shelved costing the company and Harris millions. Sudden Impact began to focus on attractions in Australia with the opening of several temporary attractions at amusement parks and traveling carnivals. In 2009, the company began to deviate from the standard scare attractions with the opening of themed indoor laser skirmish games such as AVPX at Dreamworld.

Attractions

Shows

 Ice Age on Ice

Scare School
Almost all of Sudden Impact! Entertainment Company's attractions feature live trained actors, commonly known as "scare actors". To be hired in this position, scare actors must complete the Scare School program. The Scare School is a 40-hour program where actors are trained to become the best "scarers" they can be. The Scare School has travelled the globe and has been featured in its own television series. The majority of the training is done in broad daylight with very little done indoors or at night-time.

References

External links
 

Amusement ride manufacturers
Manufacturing companies based in New York (state)
American companies established in 1991